Fulori Nabura is a Fijian rugby union player.

Biography
Nabura was named in the Fijiana squad for the 2022 Oceania Championship in New Zealand. She scored a try in the record 152–0 match against Papua New Guinea. She was named as a reserve in the test against Tonga and was in the starting lineup for the game against Samoa.

References 

Year of birth missing (living people)
Living people
Female rugby union players
Fijian female rugby union players
Fiji women's international rugby union players